The King of Tears, Lee Bang-won is a South Korean television series starring Joo Sang-wook in the title role. With this series, KBS is reviving the historical drama series after 5 years, as the last KBS historical series Jang Yeong-sil was aired in 2016. The series depicts the story of Yi Bang-won, the third king of Joseon, from a new perspective (unrelated to 1996-98 TV series Tears of the Dragon). It premiered on KBS1 December 11, 2021 and aired on Saturdays and Sundays at 21:40 (KST) till May 1, 2022.

Synopsis 
The King of Tears, Lee Bang-won sheds new light on leader Yi Bang-won, who took the initiative to establish the Empire of Joseon during the end of the Goryeo Dynasty and early Joseon Dynasty when the ancient order of Goryeo was destroyed and the new order of Joseon was created.

Cast

Main 
Joo Sang-wook as Yi Bang-won, King Taejong, the 3rd King of Joseon. Known as "Duke Jeongan" (정안공, 靖安公).
Kim Young-chul as Yi Seong-gye, King Taejo, the founder and 1st King of Joseon.
Park Jin-hee as Queen Wongyeong, the 3rd Queen Consort of Joseon.
Ye Ji-won as Queen Sindeok, the 1st Queen Consort of Joseon.

Supporting

Queen Shinui's family 
 Um Hyo-sup as Yi Bang-woo, "Grand Prince Jinan" (진안대군, 鎭安大君).
 Kim Myung-soo as Yi Bang-gwa, King Jeongjong, the 2nd King of Joseon. "Prince Yeong-an" (영안군, 永安君).
 Hong Kyung-in as Yi Bang-ui, "Grand Prince Ik-ahn" (익안대군, 益安大君).
 Jo Soon-chang as Yi Bang-gan, "Grand Prince Hoi-an" (회안대군, 懷安大君).
 Kim Chae-rin as Princess Gyeongshin, Yi Seong-gye and Queen Sinui's 1st daughter.
 Cheon Ji-won as Princess Gyeongseon, Yi Seong-gye and Queen Sinui's 2nd daughter.
 Kim Seo-yeon as Queen Jeongan, the 2nd Queen Consort of Joseon.

Queen Sindeok's family 
 Oh Seung-joon as Yi Bang-beon, Yi Seong-gye's 7th son from Queen Sindeok.
 Hong Dong-young as young Yi Bang-beon
 Kim Jin-sung as Yi Bang-seok
 Jang Jae-ha as young Yi Bang-seok
Yi Seong-gye's 8th son from Queen Sindeok, Yi Bang-won's half little brother and Joseon's first crown prince.
 Jang Tae-hoon as Yi Je, Princess Gyeongsun's husband.
 Choi Da-hye as Princess Gyeongsun, Yi Seong-gye and Queen Sindeok's daughter.
 Lee Ha-eun as Lady Ryu Hyun-bin
As Bang-seok's wife, she later causes an adultery case with the eunuch Yi Man.
Han Yoon-ji as Princess Gyeongnyeong, wife of Yi Bang-beon.

Yi Bang-won's family 
 Kim Min-gi as Yi Do, Prince Chungnyeong.
 Gu Hyun as 5-year-old Yi Do
 Joo An as 1-year-old Yi Do
 Kim Ro-woon as baby Yi Do
 Lee Tae-ri as Yi Je, Prince Yangnyeong. 
 Kim Joon-ui as 8-year-old Yi Je
 Kim In-woo as 4-year-old Yi Je
 Jung Shi-hoon as Yi Bo, Prince Hyoryeong.
 Shin Seo-woo as 7-year-old Yi Bo
 TBA as Princess Jeongsun, Yi Bang-won and Queen Wongyeong's 1st daughter.
 Im Ye-jin as young Princess Jeongsun
 Lee Do-yeon as Princess Gyeongjeong, Yi Bang-won and Queen Wongyeong's 2nd daughter.
 Park Soo-eon as young Princess Gyeongjeong
 Lee Ye-seo as Princess Gyeongan, Yi Bang-won and Queen Wongyeong's 3rd daughter.
 Kim Vi-ju as Queen Soheon.

Yi Seong-gye's family 
 Ye Soo-jung as Queen Sinui, Yi Seong-gye's first wife and Yi Bang-gwa & Yi Bang-won's mother.
 Lee Won-bal as Yi Hwa, Yi Seong-gye's half little brother. "Grand Prince Ui-ahn" (의안대군, 義安大君).
 Ban Sang-yoon as Yi Cheon-u, Yi Seong-gye's older brother.

Chonghae Yi clan 
 Seon Dong-hyuk as Yi Ji-ran
One of Joseon's founding helper and Yi Seong-gye's brother-in-law. "Prince Chung-hae" (청해군, 靑海君).
 Tae Hang-ho as Yi Hwa-sang, Yi Ji-ran's eldest son.

Queen Wongyeong's family 
 Kim Kyu-chul as Min Je, Queen Wongyeong's father. "Internal Prince Yeo-heung" (여흥부원군, 驪興府院君).
 Lee Eung-kyung as Lady Song of the Yeosan Song clan, Queen Wongyeong's mother. "Grand Lady of Samhan State" (삼한국대부인, 三韓國大夫人).
 Kim Tae-han as Min Mu-gu, Queen Wongyeong's first younger brother. "Prince Yeo-gang" (여강군, 驪江君).
 Noh Sang-bo as Min Mu-jil, Queen Wongyeong's second younger brother. "Prince Yeo-seong" (여성군, 驪城君).

Yi Bang-won's political comrades 
 Park Yoo-seung as Yoon So-jong, a politician in the early Joseon dynasty and at the end of the Goryeo dynasty.
 Nam Sung-jin as Ha Ryun, "Internal Prince Jin-san" (진산부원군, 晉山府院君).
 Kim Bup-rae as Jo Young-mu, one of Joseon's founding helper and the public relations. "Internal Prince Han-san" (한산부원군, 漢山府院君).
 Kim Geon as Jo Young-gyu, Yi Bang-won's person who helps him in the Seonjuk Bridge's accident.
 Noh Young-guk as Jo Jun, a Jwauijeong and one of Joseon's founding helper. "Internal Prince Pyung-yang" (평양부원군, 平壤府院君).
 Kim Young-gi as Kwon Geun, a politician in the early Joseon dynasty and the end of the Goryeo dynasty. "Prince Gil-chang" (길창군, 吉昌君).
 Park Chil-yong as Nam Jae
 Jung Tae-woo as Yi Suk-beon
 Lee Hyun-kyun as Park Eun
 Kang Ji-sub as Hwang Hui
 Cha Ki-hwan as Yi Geo-yi
 Im Ho as Yu Jeong-hyeon

Yi Seong-gye's political comrades 
 First strife of crown prince
 Lee Kwang-gi as Jeong Do-jeon, one of Joseon's founding helper. "Count Bong-hwa" (봉화백, 奉化伯).
 Lee Ki-yeol as Nam Eun, one of Joseon's founding helper. "Prince Ui-sung" (의성군, 宜城君).
 Lee Kyung-young as Sim Hyo-saeng
 Lee Woo-seok as Park Wi

 Second strife of crown prince
 Ahn Hong-jin as Park Po
 Park Jang-ho as Yi Maeng-jong, Prince Uiryeong.

 Jo Sa-eui's rebellion
 Jung Eui-gap as Jo Sa-eui

Goryeo people 
 Choi Jong-hwan as Jeong Mong-joo, the last loyalist of Goryeo. "Prince Ik-yang, the Count Choong-hee" (익양군 충의백, 益陽郡 忠義伯).
 Im Ji-kyu as King Woo, the 32nd King of Goryeo.
 Song Yong-tae as Choi Young, "Internal Prince Cheol-won" (철원부원군, 鐵原府院君).
 Nam Myung-ryul as Yi Saek, "Count Han-san" (한산백, 韓山伯).
Both of Jeong Do-jeon, Jeong Mong-ju, Ha-Ryun, Yoon So-jong, Yi Soong-in's teacher and a spiritual leader in the Shinjin Grand Temple, also the later Goryeo's warrior.
 Im Byung-gi as Byun An-ryeol
 Park Sang-jo as Jo Min-soo, a warrior in the later Goryeo who cause a revolt with Yi Seong-gye.
 Ki Eun-yoo as King Chang, the 33rd King of Goryeo.
 Park Hyung-joon as Wang Yo, King Gongyang, the last King of Goryeo.
A famous general in the end of Goryeo dynasty who oppose Yi Seong-gye's new dynasty.
Kim Bo-mi as Lady Ahn, Consort Jeong
The eldest member in the Goryeo Royal household who later gave the royal seal to General Yi Seong-gye and end the Goryeo dynasty.
 Choi Eun-seok as Kim Jeo, Choi Young's nephew.
 Jo Su-hyuk as Jung Deuk-hoo
 Choi Young as Kwak Chung-bo
 Lee Chang as Choi Yoo-kyung
 Kang Bong-seong as Kim Jin-yang, the limb of Jeong Mong-joo and the one who opposes Yi Seong-gye.
 Kim Jin-gook as Jeong Mong-ju-related minister

Others 
 Park Yeo-reum as an old nanny
 Choi Shi-in as gisaeng
 Lee Choon-sik as Noh Hee-bong, Taejo and Taejong's eunuch.
 Jin Zheng-gang as Zhu Yuan-zhang
 Kim Do-won as young Bul-no, a child born to Yi Bang-gwa and his concubine.

Production 
 A reunion took place on 2011 between the actors Joo Sang-wook and Park Jin-hee after filming the Giant series.
 The first script reading was held on August 24, 2021. On November 9, 2021, the production company released site images from the series.
  Initially, actress Lee Deok-hee had been cast for the role of Queen Shinui, but this apparently was changed. In this drama, she portrays a mother-and-child relationship with Um Hyo-sup, again following Stranger.
 On November 28, 2021, a report was confirmed that actor Ye Ji-won had tested positive for COVID-19 on November 27, and that filming would continue as scheduled except for her appearance.
 On January 21, 2022, KBS decided not to air two of the latest episodes originally set for release on January 22 and January 23, potentially due to controversy surrounding the death of a horse during filming.

Controversies
On January 20, KBS released an apology for a horse's death on the set during filming of the seventh episode, when a scene was filmed showing the horse and its rider falling down. The horse's hind leg had been tied up with a wire, causing the horse to flip in the air and land on its neck.

While the actor also sustained injuries, the horse died a week after the incident, generating great public outcry over animal abuse.

Viewership

Awards and nominations

Notes

References

External links 
  
 
 

2021 South Korean television series debuts
2022 South Korean television series endings
Television series set in the Joseon dynasty
Korean Broadcasting System television dramas
South Korean historical television series
Political thriller television series
Television series by Monster Union